Chagrin d’amour was a French pop duo formed 1981 in Paris and often cited as the ones who recorded the first French hip hop album. In 1982 Grégory Ken and Valli Kligerman released “Chacun fait (c'qui lui plait),” a recording of songs all performed in French with obvious influences by the rap music style. The album gained instant success in the country and sold over 3 million copies. Chagrin d’amour’s songs with simple rhymes and rap techniques caused many amateur music artists to become interested in the hip-hop style.

References

External links 
 Official website 
 Video on YouTube

French pop music groups